Cha-219 or No. 219 (Japanese: 第二百十九號驅潜特務艇) was a No.1-class auxiliary submarine chaser of the Imperial Japanese Navy that served during World War II.

History
She was laid down on 18 January 1944 at the Takamatsu shipyard of Yamanishi Shipbuilding Co., Ltd. (株式會社山西造船鐵工所) and launched later in the year. She was completed and commissioned on 9 November 1944, fitted with armaments at the Yokosuka Naval Arsenal, and assigned to the Yokosuka Defense Unit, Yokosuka Naval District. She mostly conducted patrol and escort duties out of the port of Uraga, Kanagawa. On 5 June 1945, she was assigned to the Ise Defense Force. Cha-219 survived the war.

On 1 December 1945, she was demobilized and enrolled as a minesweeper by the occupation forces. On 8 August 1947, she was released to the Ministry of Transportation. On 1 May 1948, she was assigned to the Japan Maritime Safety Agency, a sub-agency of the Ministry of Transportation, and designated on 20 August 1948 as patrol boat 14 (PB-14) with the name Shirasagi (しらさぎ). On 20 August 1951, she was re-designated as minesweeper Shirasagi (MS-85). On 1 July 1954, she was transferred to the newly created Japan Maritime Self-Defense Force and designated as Shirasagi (MS-85) and later as special agent boat YAS-08. She was delisted on 31 March 1962.

References

1944 ships
No.1-class auxiliary submarine chasers
Auxiliary ships of the Imperial Japanese Navy